Follow the Blind is the second full-length album by German power metal band Blind Guardian. It was released in 1989 and is more in the vein of speed metal, compared to the style that would later define the band's unique sound. Guitarist Marcus Siepen stated that they were "listening to a lot of thrash metal bands like Testament or Forbidden, and that's why Follow the Blind was a bit heavier".

The album was remastered, remixed and re-released on 15 June 2007, with the whole second demo tape, Battalions of Fear, of the band (at the time called Lucifer's Heritage) as part of the bonus tracks. The album was again re-released as part of the A Traveler's Guide to Space and Time boxset with minor adjustments to the mixing and with new mastering. "Banish from Sanctuary" was released as a single to promote this album.

In 2017, Loudwire ranked Follow the Blind as the 12th-best power metal album of all time.

Track listing

Lyrical references 

 "Inquisition" is a version of the Latin phrase Pie Jesu Domine, dona eis requiem ( O sweet Lord Jesus, grant them rest) chanted as it would be by monks. The phrase forms part of the Roman Catholic Requiem Mass, and is also identical to that which is chanted by the monks in Monty Python and the Holy Grail.
 "Damned for All Time" and "Fast to Madness" are based on Michael Moorcock's characters from Eternal Champion series.
 "Banish from Sanctuary" is based on the life of John the Baptist.
 "Follow the Blind" is based on Stephen King & Peter Straub's The Talisman.
 "Hall of the King" is about the faith and being faithful.
 "Valhalla" references the Mythological Valhalla, and the song is about a wizard who deplores the loss of his people's mythology, hinting at the historical shift from the Norse pagan religion to Christianity.
 "Fast to Madness" contains reference to Elric of Melniboné, the doomed albino Emperor of Melniboné, who finds Stormbringer, a sword created by Chaos, which causes him to be alienated from his close friends and his family, taking souls from each of them, eventually even taking his own soul for fulfilling the hunger of Stormbringer.

Personnel
 Hansi Kürsch – vocals and bass
 André Olbrich – lead guitar and backing vocals
 Marcus Siepen – rhythm guitar and backing vocals
 Thomas "Thomen" Stauch – drums

Guest musicians
 Kai Hansen – vocals and guitar solo on "Valhalla", guitar solo on "Hall of the King"
 Mathias Wiesner – keyboards
 Kalle Trapp – lead guitar and vocals on "Barbara Ann"
 Thomas Hackmann – backing vocals
 Rolf Köhler – backing vocals and lead vocals on "Barbara Ann"
 Aman Malek – backing vocals

Production
 Kalle Trapp – recording, mixing and producing
 van Waay Design – cover art

Charts

References 

1989 albums
Blind Guardian albums